There are approximately 372,905 listed buildings in England and 2.5% of these are Grade I.   This page is a list of these buildings in the county of Bedfordshire, by district.

Bedford

|}

Central Bedfordshire

|}

Luton

|}

See also
 :Category:Grade I listed buildings in Bedfordshire
 Grade II* listed buildings in Bedfordshire

Notes

References

External links

British Listed Buildings

 
Bedfordshire
Bedfordshire